Potassium trichloridocuprate(II) is a salt with chemical formula , more properly .

The compound occurs in nature as the bright red mineral sanguite.

The compound is also called potassium trichlorocuprate(II), potassium copper(II) trichloride, potassium cupric chloride and other similar names.  The latter is used also for potassium tetrachloridocuprate(II) .

Preparation and properties
The compound can be obtained by evaporation of a solution of potassium chloride  and copper(II) chloride  in 1:1 mole ratio.

The anhydrous form is garnet-red. It can be crystallized from a molten mixture of potassium chloride  and copper(II) chloride . or by evaporation from a solution of the salts in ethanol. It is very hygroscopic, and soluble in methanol and ethanol. It is antiferromagnetic below 30 K, and pleochroic, with maximum visible absorption when the electric vector is parallel to the Cu–Cu vector of the dimer.

Structure

Anhydrous

The anhydrous mineral form (sanguite) has the monoclinic crystal structure, with symmetry group P21/c and lattice parameters a = 402.81 pm, b = 1379.06 pm, c = 873.35 pm, and β = 97.137°,  cell volume V = 0.48138 nm3, and formulas per cell Z = 4.  The measured density is 2.86 g/cm3, close to the calculated one 2.88 g/cm3.  It contains discrete almost planar anions , each with the two copper atoms connected by two bridging chlorine atoms.  These anions are arranged in columns consisting of distorted edge-sharing  octahedra, stacked in double chains parallel to the a axis. The columns
occupy the edges and the centre of the cell's projection on the bc plane. The potassium atoms are located between these columns; each  cation is surrounded by nine chlorine atoms.  The mineral is optically biaxial (negative), with α = 1.653, β = 1.780, γ = 1.900', 2V= 85°. The mineral is named from the Latin sanguis (blood), alluding to its color.

Theoretical calculations for this topology give the lattice parameters as a = 1388.1 pm, b = 427.7 pm, c = 896.5 pm, α = 79.855°, cell volume V = 0.523891 nm3, calculated density 2.65 g/cm3.

Theoretical
An alternative theoretical structure for the compound has a cubic crystal system, symmetry group Pm3m[221], with the copper atoms arranged as corners of a cubic grid, a potassium atom at the center of each cube and a chlorine atom at the midpoint of each edge. The latice parameters are a = b = c = 485.8 pm, V = 0.114684 nm3, predicted density 3.03 g/cm3.

References

Chloro complexes
Copper(II) compounds
Potassium compounds